"Poison Heart" is a song by the punk rock band Ramones. Written by Dee Dee Ramone, who had retired as their longtime bassist in 1989 but still wrote songs for the band, "Poison Heart" was included on the 1992 album Mondo Bizarro and was also released as a single. The song was given to the band by Dee Dee in exchange for bailing him out of jail and has a slower tempo than typical Ramones songs.

A music video was produced for the song, directed by Samuel Bayer, which was later released in their 2005 compilation box set Weird Tales of the Ramones as bonus content on the DVD of their documentary Lifestyles of the Ramones. The song was also featured in the 1992 film Pet Sematary Two.

Covers
Stiv Bators, former Dead Boys vocalist and Dee Dee Ramone's friend, recorded a version of the song which was released posthumously on the 1996 album Last Race.

Finnish rock band HIM recorded and released a cover of the song as a B-side to their hit single "Wings of a Butterfly" in 2005.

P. Paul Fenech, lead singer of the psychobilly band the Meteors, covered the song on his solo album The "F" Word in 2006.

Blondie performed acoustic versions of "Poison Heart" and "I Wanna Be Your Boyfriend" at their October 14, 2006, show at CBGB's. It was the penultimate show at the club before its closing. The last show was performed the next day by Patti Smith.

Track listing
UK CHS 3917 - 7"
 "Poison Heart"
 "Censorshit"

UK 12CHSS 3917 - 12"
 "Poison Heart (Live)"
 "Chinese Rocks (Live)"
 "Sheena Is a Punk Rocker (Live)"
 "Rockaway Beach (Live)"

Personnel
 Dee Dee Ramone - writer
Joey Ramone – lead vocals
Johnny Ramone – guitar
C. J. Ramone – bass
Marky Ramone – drums
Flo & Eddie – backing vocals

Chart positions

References

Ramones songs
1992 songs
Songs written by Dee Dee Ramone
Songs written by Daniel Rey
Music videos directed by Samuel Bayer
Song recordings produced by Ed Stasium